John Henry Gray (March 11, 1859 – April 4, 1946) was an American economist. He was a professor of economics at Northwestern University, Carleton College, and the University of Minnesota. In 1914, he served as president of the American Economic Association.

A native of Charleston, Illinois, Gray earned his bachelor's degree from Harvard University in 1887. He then pursued graduate education under Johannes Conrad at the University of Halle-Wittenberg in Germany, graduating with a PhD in 1892. He was coauthor of  The Valuation and Regulation of Public Utilities.

Gray was elected as a Fellow of the American Statistical Association in 1921.

References 

1859 births
1946 deaths
People from Charleston, Illinois
Economists from Illinois
Harvard University alumni
University of Halle alumni
Northwestern University faculty
Carleton College faculty
University of Minnesota faculty
Presidents of the American Economic Association
Fellows of the American Statistical Association